Rhopobota fanjingensis is a species of moth of the family Tortricidae. It is found in Guizhou, China.

The wingspan is about 14.5 mm. The ground colour of the forewings is greyish brown, covered with slender transverse grey streaks. The hindwings are dark grey.

Etymology
The species name refers to Mount Fanjing, the type locality.

References

Moths described in 2005
Eucosmini